The Wrong Coast is a stop-motion adult animated television series. The series emulates a Hollywood gossip show with fake news and features, and includes many parodies on Hollywood movies, often utilizing the voices of real stars. It was produced by Blueprint Entertainment, Cuppa Coffee Studios and Curious Pictures, with stop-motion animation provided by Cuppa Coffee Studios. The theme song is performed by They Might Be Giants.

The series initially was to air for American audiences on AMC in December 2003, but never did. It began airing in Canada on The Movie Network in April 2004. Teletoon at Night has rebroadcast the original season in Canada since 19 August 2005. A French-dubbed version of the series, titled La Côte Ouest, aired in Canada on Télétoon la nuit. The series ended on 30 June 2004.

The full series has been released on DVD in Australia.

Characters
Jameson Burkwright - The male host of the show who is easily jealous of Debbie Sue's actions and is voiced by Mark Hamill. As of the end of the first season, Jameson is trapped in Hell.
Debbie Sue Ashanti-Melendez is the bubbly, but sometimes ditzy female host of the show. She is voiced by Kathryn Greenwood.
Ti Hua Foo - The male reporter of the show. Ti Hua is always seen covering celebrity events and interviews. He is voiced by Marc Thompson. As of the end of the first season, Ti Hua has been turned into a talking guinea pig.
Julie Wyvern - The female reporter on the show. She has a bitter rivalry with Debbie Sue. She is voiced by Tracy Nicole Chapman. As of the end of the first season, she is the new co-host of The Wrong Coast.
Mack - The producer of the show whose face is never shown until the last episode, where it is revealed he has no face. He is voiced by A.D. Miles.

Episodes
The Wrong Coast aired for one season consisting of 13 episodes.

The Acting Coach
Debbie Sue hires an acting coach to help her land the part of a journalist in the new Tom Hanks movie. Jameson tries to get in on the action by showing off his comic dialects.

Sketches
A Beautiful Behind - A parody of A Beautiful Mind
The Ted Kennedy Experiment - The Jamie Kennedy Experiment
The Godfather Part IV: All Pacino - The Godfather Trilogy
Sob Story
28 Days After, 28 Days Later After - 28 Days Later
Cash Cow
Finding Nemoy - Finding Nemo
Project Stoplight - Project Greenlight
American Idle Idol - American Idol
S.W.A.T.A.W.A.T.A.T.A.A. (Special Weapon And Tactics As Well As The Ability To Appraise Antiques)- S.W.A.T., Antiques Roadshow

The Office Party
A young production assistant blackmails Jameson and Debbie Sue with a tape of their drunken behavior at the annual Christmas party. Jameson ignores the threat while Debbie Sue becomes paranoid about what she may have done.

Sketches
70's Movie - Wayans brothers films, Jaws, Butch Cassidy and the Sundance Kid, Rocky
Apollo the 13th - Alien, Apollo 13, Friday the 13th
Sort of But Not That Freaky Friday - Freaky Friday
Joe Trillionaire - Joe Millionaire
Batman Meets the Hulk - TV series, The Incredible Hulk
Stephen King's Break
Dog Stars
Wacky Neighbours
Blood Spattered Banter - Quentin Tarantino films
Party Time Continuum: The Stephen Hawking Story - Austin Powers

Chemistry

Debbie Sue is determined to "connect" with Jameson after a bad review highlights their lack of teamwork. However, Jameson is distracted by the loss of his beloved pet ferret, Marty.

Sketches
American Booty - American Beauty, Bringing Down the House
Glengarry GlenCampbell - Glengarry Glen Ross and singer Glen Campbell
CSI: Sarasota - Parody of the CSI spinoffs (CSI: Miami, CSI: NY)
Glitter at the Crossroads - Glitter, Crossroads
Dying Hard in an Elevator - Die Hard
My Big Fat Greek Matrix - My Big Fat Greek Wedding, The Matrix

The Broken Teleprompter

When the teleprompter breaks down, Debbie Sue and Jameson are forced to think for themselves. Jameson's attempt to ad-lib the news starts a rumor that Kevin Spacey is trying to kill Queen Latifah.

Sketches
 First Wives Fight Club - The First Wives Club, Fight Club
Magical Black Men - Magical negros; Bruce Almighty, The Legend of Bagger Vance, The Family Man
Jack Morris' Life - Parody of movie trailer announcers, such as Don LaFontaine and Hal Douglas
Dr. Phil talks to Freckles
Willy Shatner and the Chocolate Factory - William Shatner, Star Trek, Willy Wonka & the Chocolate Factory
Dead and Deader - Dumb and Dumber, The Sixth Sense
Eminem tries out for Romeo and Juliet

Blood Red Carpet

There is much chaos as a horde of man-eating tigers takes over the red carpet at the 76th Annual Big Gold Awards. Jameson and Debbie Sue show "live" footage of the attacks, while showing clips of the Best Picture nominees.

Sketches
When Harry Met Sally Struthers - When Harry Met Sally...
Pizza Deliverance - Deliverance
Brilliantly Dumb - Forrest Gump, I Am Sam, Rain Man, The Other Sister
Water Wolves - Waterworld, Dances with Wolves
Flatch Adams - Patch Adams

Your Stalker or Mine?

Debbie Sue brags that her new stalker is the ultimate celebrity status symbol, and when Jameson gets jealous, he attempts to attract his own stalker. While arguing over who is in the most danger, their stalkers become more interested in each other.

Sketches
Seabisque - Seabiscuit, Iron Chef, and a small reference to Spider-Man 
N.Y.P.D.A.D.D - N.Y.P.D., Attention-deficit disorder (ADD)
Endless Moaning
Big Baby - Big
Late Night Laughs - The Tonight Show with Jay Leno
What Are You Doing In My Bedroom? The Jameson Burkright Story 
Feasting for Famine

Salaries

Jameson is shocked to find Debbie Sue on a list of Hollywood's richest people. His jealousy turns to ridicule, however, when she finally tells the source of her extra income, her work at a fortune telling hotline.

Sketches
Mission: Impossible 3 (the only sketch that actually came to the big screen)
Dr. Cop Lawyer - Medical dramas/Police procedurals/Legal dramas; Law & Order
Texas Chainsaw Manicure - The Texas Chain Saw Massacre
Crocodile Dundee Hunter - Crocodile Dundee, The Crocodile Hunter
Second Term Terminator: Re-election Day - Terminator 3: Rise of the Machines, The 2003 California Recall Election

The Infies

After Debbie Sue wins an Infy infotainment award, Jameson gets jealous and quits. But Debbie Sue goes on just fine without him, so Jameson tries to get his way back on the show.

Sketches
Jettison Man - Spider-Man, The Tick
Queer Eye for the Bad Guy - Queer Eye for the Straight Guy
Golden Girls Gone Wild - The Golden Girls, Girls Gone Wild
Stormbringer 2
Charlie's Angels: Full Frontal - Charlie's Angels: Full Throttle

Lights! Camera! Romance!

After Jameson saves Debbie Sue from a falling stage light, she falls in love with him. But the romance quickly deteriorates into mind games, and it isn't long before the tears are flowing.

Sketches
The Onion Ring - The Ring
762,120 - 24
Poltergoat - Poltergeist
Beer Factor - Fear Factor
P. Diddy Day Care - Daddy Day Care
Al Pacino's Sitcom
How to Lose a Guy in 28 Days Later - How to Lose a Guy in 10 Days, 28 Days Later

Sundance

Jameson and Debbie Sue report from the Sundance Film Festival. Ti Hua overreacts to being stranded in a gondola with John Turturro, and Julie continually attempts to get into an A-list party.

Sketches
Uno Memento - Memento
American Pi - American Pie, Pi
Buzz
Troubled Youth - Prozac Nation
The Horse Shouterer - The Horse Whisperer

Addicted

Debbie Sue returns from "back surgery" with a huge appetite for painkillers. Jameson plans an intervention to get her off from her addiction by enlisting several B-listers who need screen time. Meanwhile, Ti Hua undergoes the ultimate makeover, but gets turned into a guinea pig.

Sketches
Dead Movie Star Jurassic Park - Jurassic Park
A Few Good Men and a Baby - A Few Good Men, Three Men and a Baby
Complidate - Blind Date
Tragedy on the Tracks
Operation Perfect Smile
The Re-enactment of the Siege of Bolingbroke - Siege of Bolingbroke Castle
Transspecies
Law & Order: P.V.U. (Parking Violations Unit) - Law & Order: SVU

Possessed

Jameson and Debbie Sue are shocked to discover that the Wrong Coast studio is possessed by a demon. An attempt to exorcise the demon backfires, and Jameson gets stranded in Hell.

Sketches
There's Something About Mary Poppins - There's Something About Mary, Mary Poppins
Titanic II - Titanic
Dennis Hopper Orders a Margarita
Siegfried & Roy return to the stage - Siegfried & Roy, Roy's tiger injury

A Look Back at Yestermonth

A clip show showing a look back at the first season of The Wrong Coast. With Jameson stranded in Hell, Debbie Sue is happy that she is the only host left - until Julie Wyvern joins as co-host. A sip of champagne pushes Debbie Sue off the wagon, and Mack finally reveals his "face".

Sketches
(Selected from previous episodes)
Seabisque - Seabiscuit, Iron Chef, and a small reference to Spider-Man
My Big Fat Greek Matrix - My Big Fat Greek Wedding, The Matrix
American Booty - American Beauty, Bringing Down The House
Crocodile Dundee Hunter - Crocodile Hunter, Crocodile Dundee
Dying Hard in an Elevator - Die Hard
Magical Black Men - Magical negros; Bruce Almighty, The Legend of Bagger Vance, The Family Man
Flatch Adams - Patch Adams
The Horse Shouterer - The Horse Whisperer
S.W.A.T.A.W.A.T.A.T.A.A. - S.W.A.T., Antiques Roadshow
Charlie's Angels: Full Frontal - Charlie's Angels: Full Throttle

See also
 Spitting Image
 Les Guignols de l'info
 This Hour Has 22 Minutes
 The Daily Show

References

External links
The Wrong Coast at the Internet Movie Database
Cuppa Coffee Series including The Wrong Coast, accessed 10 September 2006
epguides.com: The Wrong Coast, accessed 10 September 2006
Teletoon press release via Mediacaster, 15 July 2005, accessed 10 September 2006

2000s American animated comedy television series
2000s American adult animated television series
2000s American parody television series
2000s American sketch comedy television series
2003 American television series debuts
2004 American television series endings
2000s Canadian animated comedy television series
2000s Canadian adult animated television series
2000s Canadian sketch comedy television series
2003 Canadian television series debuts
2004 Canadian television series endings
American adult animated comedy television series
American stop-motion animated television series
Canadian adult animated comedy television series
Canadian parody television series
Canadian stop-motion animated television series
Crossover animated television series
English-language television shows
Crave original programming
Teletoon original programming
Television series by Curious Pictures
Television series by Entertainment One
Television series by Bell Media
Television series by Corus Entertainment
Television series by Cuppa Coffee Studios